The Qom River or Qom Roud is a large river in Iran that receives its water from the Zagros Mountains and mounds into the Namak Lake. The water level strongly fluctuates between 312 m³/s and only 4 m³/s. This is partially the effect of taking water for irrigation.

In 2014, the World Resources Institute ranked the Qom basin as "extremely high" for water stress.

References 

Landforms of Qom Province
Rivers of Qom Province